Adriaen Jansz Kraen (1619, Haarlem – 1679, Haarlem), was a Dutch still life painter.

Biography
In 1637 he joined the Haarlem Guild of St. Luke and in 1638 he is recorded in their books as the pupil of Jacob Willemszoon de Wet.  He married his master's sister, Maria de Wet, on 13 August 1641. In 1642 he became master in the guild. His works are often confused with other Haarlem still life painters such as Pieter Claesz and Willem Claesz Heda.

References

External links

1619 births
1679 deaths
Dutch Golden Age painters
Dutch male painters
Artists from Haarlem
Painters from Haarlem
Dutch still life painters